Mount Royal (officially Town of Mount Royal, abbreviated TMR) is an affluent on-island suburban town located on the northwest side of the eponymous Mount Royal, northwest of Downtown Montreal, on the Island of Montreal in southwestern Quebec, Canada. It is completely surrounded by the city of Montreal. The population was 20,953 as of the 2021 Canadian census. In 2008, most of the Town of Mount Royal was designated a National Historic Site of Canada, as a "[remarkable] synthesis of urban renewal movements of the early 20th century, reflecting the influence of the City Beautiful, Garden City and Garden Suburb movements". The town celebrated its 100th anniversary in 2012.

History
Town of Mount Royal, or TMR, was founded in 1912. It was created at the initiative of the Canadian Northern Railway as a means of generating funds for the tunnel to be built under the mountain, which would connect the railway to downtown Montreal. The town was designed by Frederick Todd, a planner who was heavily influenced by the likes of Sir Ebenezer Howard and incorporated many aspects of the Garden City Movement as well some elements of the earlier City Beautiful movement into his design. The plan was to build a model city at the foot of Mount Royal.  The company bought  of farmland, and then built a rail tunnel under Mount Royal connecting their land to downtown Montreal. The profits from the venture helped finance the development of Canadian Northern's transcontinental railroad, which eventually became a significant constituent of the Canadian National Railway system. The town was designed by Canadian Northern's chief engineer, Henry Wicksteed, based loosely on Washington, D.C.

The garden city’s coat of arms is composed of several significant elements:
• The royal crown, of French origin, is enclosed in the top panel and blazoned with fleurons.
• Two heraldic roses, of English origin, are stylized wild roses with two rows of five petals separated by pointed sepals.
• The stylized mountain refers to the Town’s geographic situation at the foot of Mount Royal.
• The outline of the shield ending in a point recalls the shape of the shields of ancient Greece and Rome.
• Inscribed on the scroll beneath the shield, the motto, Regium Donum, means “gift of the king.”
• Town of Mount Royal’s official signature includes the coat of arms as well as the Town’s name in French and English. The coat of arms has evolved over the years; the current version dates from 1993.

One notable feature of the town is the naming of some of its streets, and also its occasionally idiosyncratic numbering system. Some streets which pass through the town may thus bear two names (in whichever language). For example, Jean Talon Street, a large East-West thoroughfare crossing Montreal for kilometres (miles), goes a few hundred metres (yards) through TMR under the name of Dresden Avenue, only to recover its Montreal name on the other side of the town. This situation has been recently addressed by putting the two names on the street signs. On these few hundred metres, TMR uses a house civic numbering totally different from that of Montreal on either side. This sort of change in the numbering system also occurs on smaller streets shared by both Montreal and TMR (for example, Trenton, Lockhart and Brookfield avenues, where the TMR numbering system decreases from East to West, only to jump from 2 to 2400 on the few metres (yards) of the street that still belong to Montreal.

In the beginning, the Town was a small farming community, known for its melons. The Daoust family farm grew the celebrated Montreal melon, also called the Montreal nutmeg melon. Green-fleshed and uniquely flavourful, the melons weighed up to 9 or 11 kg. So special was the Montreal melon that it was exported to New York, Chicago and Boston, where, in 1921, people paid as much as $1.50 a slice to taste it. Farming was abandoned over the years, with the gradual urbanization of the Town.

On January 1, 2002, as part of the 2002–2006 municipal reorganization of Montreal, it was merged into Montreal and became a borough.  However, after a change of government and a 2004 referendum, it was re-constituted as an independent town on January 1, 2006.

Geography

Two main thoroughfares, Laird Boulevard and Graham Boulevard, cut across the borough diagonally and meet at Connaught Park, a green space located in the centre. Mount Royal Train Station, a commuter train station on the Exo Deux-Montagnes line is located to the east of this park. This line is now undergoing construction to upgrade it for the new REM network. Trains going through the Mount Royal Tunnel link the station to downtown Montreal in eight minutes. Both avenues end at Jean Talon Street and close to the highway.

TMR is surrounded on three sides by a highway, a fence and a rail line.

The highway is Metropolitan Boulevard, a major constituent of Autoroute 40. It was built as an elevated highway throughout, except when it passes through TMR (between Sainte Croix Avenue and L'Acadie Boulevard), since the Town council requested that it be built on the ground, in order to separate the town from the industrial area to the north.

A fence runs along the eastern border with Park Extension at L'Acadie Boulevard, a six lane thoroughfare. The stated purpose of the fence is to prevent children and house pets from running into the busy thoroughfare but some have contended that it was built to keep residents of the working-class Park Extension neighbourhood out of the town.

The rail line is the last portion of Canadian Pacific's Adirondack subdivision. It originally ran through the northern part of the district of Côte-des-Neiges. However, when the town became part of Montreal on Jan 1, 2002, the part of Côte-des-Neiges north of rail line was incorporated into the Mount Royal borough. When the town demerged on Jan 1, 2006 this part, known as Glenmount, reverted to Côte-des-Neiges.

Demographics 

Government

Municipal council

Mayor Peter J. Malouf was elected 7 November 2021, defeating former municipal councillor Michelle Setlakwe, the first mayoral election in 16 years. Voter Participation was 48.7%. Despite the COVID pandemic, 6,779 residents voted by mail or in person.

In 2020, TMR was divided from six into eight electoral districts to reflect its growing population of 22,000 residents. The Town mayor sits on the Agglomeration Council of Montreal.

2021-25 Municipal Council (100% new slate of elected officials):
Mayor: Peter J. Malouf – 55.47% (3710 votes)
Councillors:
 District No. 1: Antoine Tayar - 54.89% (578 votes) 
 District No. 2: Maryam Kamali Nezhad - 53.85% (385 votes)
 District No. 3: Daniel Pilon - 57.42% (511 votes)
 District No. 4: Maya Chammas - 53.48% (430 votes)
 District No. 5: Julie Halde - 51.97% (408 votes)
 District No. 6: Caroline Decaluwe - 51.60% (387 votes)
 District No. 7: Sébastien Dreyfuss - 50.74% (448 votes)
 District No. 8: Sophie Séguin - 66.43% (550 votes)

Former mayors

The first mayor of the Town of Mount-Royal was Thomas S. Darling, elected in 1913.

 Thomas S. Darling (1913-1934)
 Frederick (Fred) Johnson (1934–1935)
 Samuel (Sam) H. Hanson (1935)
 John Arthur Dakin (1935 – 1937)
 Robert Smith (1937 – 1941)
 Maynard Albert Metcalf (1941– 1945)
 Richard Earle Schofield (1945–1951)
 Reginald John Partridge Dawson (1951–1987
 Vera Mystic Danyluk (1987–1994)
 Harry Schwartz (1994–1999)
 Pierre Brisebois (1999 interim)
 Ricardo Hrtschan (1999 – 2001)
 Suzanne Caron (2002 – 2005)
 Vera Mystic Danyluk (2005 – 2010)
 Philippe Roy (2010 –2021)
 Peter J. Malouf (2021 – )

Federal and Provincial
The entire borough is located within the federal riding of Mount Royal, whose best-known MP for nearly 20 years was Pierre Trudeau, and within the smaller provincial electoral district of Mount Royal. The Mount Royal riding has been a Liberal stronghold since 1940.

The riding encompasses Côte St. Luc, Hampstead, Côte des Neiges and the Town of Mount Royal.
Since 2015, Mr. Anthony Housefather has served as Member of The House of Commons - Mount Royal

Mount Royal shares its provincial territory with Outremont since 2018, making it the Mont-Royal–Outremont provincial electoral district. Since October 2022, the riding is represented by Liberal Michelle Setlakwe that replaced the long time MP Pierre Arcand.

Education
The Commission scolaire Marguerite-Bourgeoys (CSMB) operates Francophone public schools.

Secondary schools:
 École secondaire Mont-Royal
 École secondaire Pierre-Laporte

Primary schools:
 École primaire Académie Saint-Clément
 École primaire Saint-Clément Ouest
 École primaire Saint-Clément Est
The English Montreal School Board (EMSB) operates Anglophone public schools in the town.
 Carlyle Elementary School
 Dunrae Gardens Elementary School

The Town has its own library, Reginald J. P. Dawson Library, which is independent from the Montreal Library Network.

See also
 List of enclaves
 List of former boroughs
 Montreal Merger
 Municipal reorganization in Quebec

References

External links

 
Cities and towns in Quebec
Populated places established in 1912
Planned cities in Canada
National Historic Sites in Quebec
1912 establishments in Quebec
Bilingual cities and towns in Quebec
Island of Montreal municipalities